(1571? – 1656) was an early Christian in Japan. By birth Ōmura Sono, she took the Christian name . The fifth daughter of Christian daimyō Ōmura Sumitada, she was the wife of Matsura Hisanobu and the mother of Matsura Takanobu.

Portraits dating to 1653 by Kanō Yasunobu of Shōtō-in, of her son  (the Dharma name of Takanobu), and of her second daughter  are preserved in the Matsura Historical Museum in Hirado.

See also
 Hirado Domain
 Ōmura Domain
 Kakure kirishitan

References

Matsura clan
1570s births
1656 deaths
Japanese Roman Catholics
Year of birth uncertain